Mike Herbert (born September 30, 1960) is an American sprint canoer who competed from the late 1980s to the late 1990s. He won three medals at the ICF Canoe Sprint World Championships with two silvers (K-1 500 m and K-2 500 m: both 1990) and a bronze (K-1 500 m: 1989).

Herbert also competed in three Summer Olympics, earning his best finish of fourth in the K-1 500 m event at Seoul in 1988.

References 

Sports-reference.com profile

1960 births
American male canoeists
Canoeists at the 1988 Summer Olympics
Canoeists at the 1992 Summer Olympics
Canoeists at the 1996 Summer Olympics
Living people
Olympic canoeists of the United States
ICF Canoe Sprint World Championships medalists in kayak
Pan American Games medalists in canoeing
Pan American Games gold medalists for the United States
Pan American Games silver medalists for the United States
Canoeists at the 1991 Pan American Games
Medalists at the 1991 Pan American Games